The Music is a 1972 Japanese film directed by Yasuzo Masumura, based on the novel of the same name by Yukio Mishima. The leading roles are taken by Noriko Kurosawa, Toshiyuki Hosokawa, Choei Takahashi and Kohji Moritsugu.

References

1972 films
1970s Japanese films